The Romanian Church of the Holy Trinity is a church in Deliblato, Serbia. It was built in 1925.

References

Romanian Orthodox churches in Serbia
Romanians in Serbia